Michel Dubois (21 September 1937 – 4 July 2021) was a French theatre director and actor.

Biography
He retired from the theatre in 2006.

Michel Dubois died in Paris on 4 July 2021 at the age of 83.

Theatre

Actor
La Charrue et les étoiles (1962)
Un homme seul (1966)
Mr Puntila and his Man Matti (1966)
Les Derniers (1967)
The Government Inspector (1967)
 (1968)
Avoir (1969)
 (1989)
La Fabrique de couleurs (1992)
La Botte et sa chaussette (1995)
Révélations (2007)

Director
Andorra (1965)
Le Drame des mots (1972)
Titus Andronicus (1972)
Martin Luther et Thomas Münzer (1973)
Les Estivants (1976)
Loin d'Hagondange (1976)
La Gangrène (1977)
Lenz (1977)
L'Imbécile (1979)
Le Désamour Scènes de vie, de mort et de ménage (1980)
Le Nouveau Menoza (1980)
Actes relatifs à la vie, à la mort et à l'œuvre de Monsieur Raymond Roussel, homme de lettres (1983)
Krapp's Last Tape (1983)
Double Inconstancy (1984)
Été (1984)
Amphitryon (1986)
Titus Andronicus (1987)
Ainsi va le monde (1988)
L'Étalon Or (1988)
La Chambre et le temps (1991)
La Princesse de Milan (1991)
La Tempête (1992)
Un ciel pâle sur la ville (1993)
La Botte et sa chaussette (1994)
Caresses (1994)
La serveuse quitte à quatre heures (1994)
La Botte et sa chaussette (1995)
 (1995)
Moi qui ai servi le Roi d'Angleterre (1995)
The Merchant of Venice (1998)
La Maison des cœurs brisés (1999)
Si c'est un homme (2001)
The Master Builder (2001)
Vêtir ceux qui sont nus (2002)

References

1937 births
2021 deaths
French male stage actors
French theatre directors
French people of Swiss descent
People from the Bernese Jura